Mahendrawada is a Village in East Godavari district in Anaparthy mandal The state of Andhra Pradesh in India.

References 

Villages in Anaparthy mandal